Sergey Leonidovich Dorenko (18 October 1959 – 9 May 2019) was a Russian TV and radio journalist, known for hosting a weekly news commentary program in 1999–2000.

Biography
In 1982, Dorenko graduated from People's Friendship University of Russia in Moscow, and served as a Portuguese-Russian translator in Angola. In June 1984, he was drafted to the military, but was discharged in January 1985 due to health problems.

In April 1985, Dorenko became an employee of Gosteleradio (State Television and Radio Broadcasting Company, the only TV and radio broadcaster in the Soviet Union).

Between 1996 and 1999, he hosted Vremya, a news commentary program on ORT. In September 1999, Dorenko hosted the weekly Sergey Dorenko Show on Saturdays at 9pm, and in November 1999 became a Deputy Director General of ORT. He was critical of the Mayor of Moscow, Yuriy Luzhkov, Yevgeny Primakov and their party Fatherland-All Russia, who were major opponents of Vladimir Putin and the pro-Putin party Unity during the 1999 State Duma electoral campaign. In his program, collages of Luzhkov in women's dress were shown.

In August 2000, Dorenko's program criticized the government handling of the submarine Kursk explosion. Soon afterwards, his program was cancelled, and Dorenko alleged that this was a result of pressure from the Kremlin. According to BBC News, Dorenko told Echo of Moscow radio at the time that "on 29th August the president proposed that I join his team, as he put it, and stay at Channel 1 to be his favourite and best-loved journalist."

"I said to him: I am very sorry, I can and very much would like to work at Channel 1 but as part of the team of the viewers. [President Putin] just said in reply: I see that you have not yet made up your mind. I said: On the contrary, I have made up my mind, in favour of the viewers."

The director of Network ORT, Konstantin Ernst, insisted that contrary to Dorenko's allegations, the government had not been involved in the change, and that he made the decision to cancel the show because Dorenko had refused to stop discussing the government's plan to nationalize media magnate Boris Berezovsky's 49% stake in the network. Following this incident, Dorenko became a vocal critic of Vladimir Putin's rule and did not work again for Russian television. Instead, he hosted radio programs for Echo of Moscow.

On 30 September 2003, in Stavropol Krai, Dorenko joined the Communist Party of the Russian Federation. Two years later, Dorenko published 2008, a work of political fiction about an upcoming revolution in Russia, featuring President Vladimir Putin and Igor Sechin, his close ally.

On 23 May 2007, Dorenko provided The Associated Press and The Wall Street Journal with the full video tape of an interview he recorded in April 1998 with Alexander Litvinenko and fellow FSB employees, where the agents appeared to confess that their bosses had ordered them to kill, kidnap or frame prominent Russian politicians and businesspeople, and thus made it publicly available in full for the first time. Only some excerpts of the video had been shown in 1998.

From 2008 to 2013, he was editor-in-chief of the Russian News Service radio station.

Since 2014, Dorenko was the founder and chief editor of the Govorit Moskva radio station.

Health issues and death
On 9 May 2019, Dorenko was riding his Triumph Bonneville motorcycle in the center of Moscow when he began veering into oncoming traffic, reportedly after suffering a cardiac event. Dorenko avoided collision with other vehicles, but struck the concrete guard rail on the opposite side of the highway. Dorenko was hospitalized, with doctors attempting to revive him for over an hour. Having never regained consciousness he was pronounced dead. Subsequent reports identified aortic rupture as the cause of Dorenko's death. It was reported that Dorenko had been aware of his diagnosis since 2016 and his untimely death could have been avoided with proper treatment and medical care.

See also
 Artyom Borovik
 Evgeny Dodolev
 Marina Lesko
 Vladislav Listyev
 Alexander Nevzorov

References

External links
 

1959 births
2019 deaths
Russian people of Ukrainian descent
Russian people of Romanian descent
Russian people of Bulgarian descent
Russian television journalists
Peoples' Friendship University of Russia alumni
Russian television presenters
Echo of Moscow radio presenters
People from Kerch
People from the Crimean Oblast
Russian YouTubers